News in Hell is a 1959 Argentine film directed by Román Viñoly Barreto.

Cast
  Osvaldo Miranda
  Nélida Bilbao
  Nathán Pinzón
  Argentinita Vélez
  José Cibrián
  Néstor Deval
  María Esther Buschiazzo
  Rafael Frontaura
  Alba Mujica
  Alejandro Maximino
  Carlos Rossi
  Lili Gacel
  Ariel Absalón

External links
 

1959 films
1950s Spanish-language films
Argentine black-and-white films
Films directed by Román Viñoly Barreto
1950s Argentine films